Evgenii Torsunov (Russian: Евгений Торсунов, born 30 August 1990) is a Russian para-athlete. He represented Russian Paralympic Committee athletes at the 2020 Summer Paralympics and won a gold medal in the long jump T36 event.

References

1990 births
Living people
Paralympic athletes of Russia
Medalists at the World Para Athletics European Championships
Medalists at the World Para Athletics Championships
Athletes (track and field) at the 2020 Summer Paralympics
Medalists at the 2020 Summer Paralympics
Paralympic medalists in athletics (track and field)
Sportspeople from Perm, Russia
Paralympic gold medalists for the Russian Paralympic Committee athletes
Russian male sprinters
Russian male long jumpers
21st-century Russian people